The Yamal–Gydan tundra ecoregion (WWF ID: PA1114 "Yamalagydanskaja tundra") is an ecoregion that covers the Yamal Peninsula and Gydan Peninsula in northern Russia. Plants and animals are sparse, although the area is an important one for migratory birds, and for coastal sea mammals. The ecoregion is in the Palearctic realm, and the tundra biome.

Location and description 
The peninsulas lie east of the northern Ural mountains at the ocean outlet of the Ob River delta (the Gulf of Ob), and the Yenisei River estuary. The Kara Sea is the marginal sea of the Arctic Ocean to the north, and several offshore islands are also included in the ecoregion. These islands include Bely Island. The peninsula's are flat, with extensive wetlands.  The area is in the continuous permafrost zone.

Climate 
The climate of the Yamal-Gydan tundra ecoregion is Humid continental climate, cool summer (Köppen climate classification (Dfc)). Mean precipitation is about 514 mm/year.

Flora and fauna 
The area's floral characteristics are formed in patchworks of hummocky lichen-moss and shrub-mass areas, separated by bare ground or wetlands. The lichen tundra and bare ground is more common in the north, and in the lichen-moss communities the grass-shrub layer is thin.  Marshes are heavily influenced by the strong spring floods, and the rains in the early autumn. Mammals in the area are limited to Arctic fox, lemmings, and a few small herd of reindeer. There are estimated to be 50 species of nesting birds, and the area is an important extension of the Atlantic flyway.

Protections 
There is one significant nationally protected area in this ecoregion: the Gydan Nature Reserve.

See also 
 List of ecoregions in Russia

References 

Ecoregions of Russia
Palearctic ecoregions
Tundra ecoregions